Beyers Swanepoel (born 6 May 1998) is a South African cricketer. He made his first-class debut for Free State in the 2016–17 Sunfoil 3-Day Cup on 9 March 2017. He made his List A debut for Free State in the 2017–18 CSA Provincial One-Day Challenge on 15 October 2017. He was the leading wicket-taker in the 2018 University Sports South Africa tournament while playing for the University of the Free State. His performance during the tournament saw him included in the tournament's team that will participate in the Future Cup in April 2019.

In September 2019, he was named in Northern Cape's squad for the 2019–20 CSA Provincial T20 Cup. He made his Twenty20 debut for Northern Cape in the 2019–20 CSA Provincial T20 Cup on 13 September 2019. In April 2021, he was named in Northern Cape's squad, ahead of the 2021–22 cricket season in South Africa.

References

External links
 

1998 births
Living people
South African cricketers
Free State cricketers
Place of birth missing (living people)